{{Infobox television
| image              =
| caption            = 
| genre              = 
| creator            = 
| based_on           = Scena misterelor by Antena 1
| developer          = 
| director           = 
| presenter          = Attila Till
| starring           = 
| opentheme          = 
| endtheme           = 
| composer           = 
| country            = Hungary
| language           = Hungarian
| num_seasons        = 2
| num_episodes       = 14
| list_episodes      = 
| executive_producer = Ádám Németh
| producer           = 
| cinematography     = 
| editor             = 
| camera             = Multi-camera
| runtime            = 140 mins
| company            = 
| location           = Mafilm filmgyár
| distributor        = 
| budget             = 
| network            = TV2
| picture_format     = 
| audio_format       = 
| first_aired        = 
| last_aired         = present
| related            = Álarcos énekes 
}}Nicsak, ki vagyok?'' is a Hungarian reality singing competition television series based on the Mysteries in the spotlight franchise that originated from the Romanian version of the show Scena misterelor. The first season premiered on TV2 on 16 February 2020 and ended on 26 April 2020. The second season premiered on 22 November 2020 and ended on 10 January 2021.

Due to the COVID-19 pandemic, the March 15 broadcast was aired without the public, and the March 22 broadcast was not live and therefore viewers could not vote. The final was held on April 26 with security measures.

Panelists and host

In the first season, there were two teams that competed against each other. The first team consisted of singer Judy, comedian András Hajós, and rapper Majka while the second team was rapper Ganxsta Zolee, actress Anita Ábel, and stylist Csaba Kajdi. Attila Till was the host.

In the second season, the lineup of the two teams were changed entirely while Atilla Till was still kept on as host. The first team consisted of stylist Csaba Kajdi, presenter Vivien Mádai, and singer Joci Pápai while the second team was actress Anita Ábel, footballer András Csonka and singer Viktor Király.

Season 1

Contestants

Episodes

Episode 1 (16 February)

Episode 2 (23 February)

Episode 3 (1 March)

Episode 4 (8 March)

Episode 5 (15 March)

Episode 6 (22 March)

Episode 7 - Finale (26 April)
 Group number: "Amikor feladnád" by Halott Pénz

Season 2

Contestants

Episodes

Episode 1 (22 November)

Episode 2 (29 November)

Episode 3 (6 December)

Episode 4 (13 December)

Episode 5 (20 December)

Episode 5 - Semi-Finals (3 January)
 Group Performance: "Don't You Worry Child" by Swedish House Mafia feat. John Martin

Episode 7 - Finale (10 January)

Ratings

References

External links 
 Official website

Hungarian reality television series
2020 Hungarian television series debuts
TV2 (Hungarian TV channel) original programming